Jorge Coste Cacho (born 11 November 1988) is a Mexican professional football defender who formerly played for Chiapas in the Primera División de México.

References

Living people
1988 births
Footballers from Mexico City
Chiapas F.C. footballers
Association football defenders
Mexican footballers